Cerithium matukense is a species of sea snail, a marine gastropod mollusk in the family Cerithiidae.

Description
The shell is turreted, slender and elongate, with 15-23 straight-sided whorls with an apical angle of 20 degrees. The shell can reach 70.5 mm length and 18.2 mm width. The snail itself has a short, wide snout with thick cephalic tentacles and tiny black eyes.

Distribution
This marine species occurs in the western Pacific and the Indian Ocean, near the Philippines, Fiji, New Caledonia, Borneo, Guam, and the Kermadecs, and has been found near Hawaii.

Diet 
They are thought to eat algae and detritus.

References

 Wissema G.G. (1947). Young Tertiary and Quaternary Gastropoda from the Island of Nias (Malay Archipelago). 212 pp., 6 plates, 1 map. Leiden: Becherer.
 Spencer, H.G., Marshall, B.A. & Willan, R.C. (2009). Checklist of New Zealand living Mollusca. Pp 196-219. in: Gordon, D.P. (ed.) New Zealand inventory of biodiversity. Volume one. Kingdom Animalia: Radiata, Lophotrochozoa, Deuterostomia. Canterbury University Press
 Hasegawa K. (2017). Family Cerithiidae. Pp. 788-793, in: T. Okutani (ed.), Marine Mollusks in Japan, ed. 2. 2 vols. Tokai University Press. 1375 pp.

External links
 Watson R.B. (1879-1883). Mollusca of H.M.S. 'Challenger' Expedition. Journal of the Linnean Society (London). 14: 506-529, 586-605, 692-716 [1879; 15: 87-126, 217-230 [1880], 245-274, 388-412, 413-455, 457-475 [1881]; 16: 247-254, 324-343, 358-372, 373-392 [1882], 594-611 [1883]; 17: 26-40, 112-130, 284-293, 319-340, 341-346]
 Houbrick R.S. (1992). Monograph of the genus Cerithium Bruguière in the Indo-Pacific (Cerithiidae: Prosobranchia). Smithsonian Contributions to Zoology. 510: 1-211

Cerithiidae
Gastropods described in 1880